The 2005 World Rowing Championships were World Rowing Championships that were held from 29 August to 4 September 2005 at the Nagaragawa International Regatta Course in Kaizu, Gifu Prefecture, Japan. The international rowing season usually ends with the World Championship regatta. Apart from the Olympic Games, this is the most prestigious international rowing event attracting over 1,000 rowers. The 2005 championships were the first championships to be held in Asia.

Medal summary

Men's events
 Non-Olympic classes

Women's events
 Non-Olympic classes

Pararowing 
World Rowing Championship races in the Para classes are usually held over the Paralympic distance of 1000 meters. Exceptionally at 2005 World Rowing Championships, the LTA mixed coxed four was raced over the Olympic distance of 2000 meters as a trial.

Medal table

References

External links
 2005 World Rowing Championships official website
 World Championship Medal Winners

World Rowing Championships
World Rowing Championships
International sports competitions hosted by Japan
World Rowing
Rowing competitions in Japan
Sports competitions in Gifu Prefecture
Rowing
Rowing